Fahid Ben Khalfallah (born 9 October 1982) is a retired professional footballer who last played for and was head coach of Australian side Nunawading City. Born in France, he represented the Tunisia national team between 2008 and 2011.

Career

Early career 
Ben Khalfallah played in the French second and third divisions until the age of 25, first with Amiens SC, then with Stade Lavallois and Angers SCO, until he got his first taste of Ligue 1 football with SM Caen. His new team, however, was relegated at the end of the season after a decent first season in Ligue 1 for the midfielder.

Valenciennes 
In the summer of 2009, he signed for Valenciennes FC for three years. He started the season very well, starting five games and coming on as a substitute in another five, scoring 3 goals and providing 5 assists.

Bordeaux 
In August 2010, Ben Khalfallah joined Bordeaux signing a four-year contract with a fee of €5 million being paid to Valenciennes.

Troyes 
He joined Troyes in January 2014.

Melbourne Victory 
In September 2014 he signed a one-year contract with Melbourne Victory.

His first season in Australia was very successful; scoring five goals and making nine assists in the A-League helping to win that competitions Premiership and Championship, as well as being awarded the Victory Medal as the club's player of the season.

On 24 April 2015, Melbourne Victory announced that they had retained Ben Khalfallah's services for a further two years, the player citing that he enjoyed life in Melbourne and playing for the club.

On 26 April 2017, Ben Khalfallah confirmed that he would be leaving the Victory at the end of the season. This was confirmed by the club on 12 May 2017, with Ben Khalfallah listed as one of 7 players departing the club at the end of the season.

Brisbane Roar 
Ben Khalfallah signed with rival A-League club Brisbane Roar on a one-season deal shortly after leaving the Victory.
On 20 April 2018, following the elimination of Brisbane Roar against Melbourne City in the A-League Elimination Finals, Fahid Ben Khalfallah decided to retire at the age of 35.

Nunawading City 
On 19 May 2018, only a month after announcing his retirement, Ben Khalfallah came out of retirement and sign for NPL2 East Victoria club Nunawading City for the remainder of the season. After promising the coaching staff he would play for Nunawading after his stint with Roar, Ben Khalfallah made his debut on the same day his signing was announced against the Eastern Lions in a goalless draw. Ben Khalfallah scored his first goal for Nunawading against Melbourne City FC Youth, winning the game 3–1. Nunawading finished the season in bottom place in NPL2 East and were relegated to the fifth-tier State League Division 1 South-East for 2019.

In September 2018, Ben Khalfallah was announced as player-coach of Nunawading for the 2019 State League 1 season. Nunawading went on to finish top of the 2019 State League 1 South East ladder, winning the league and winning promotion back into the NPL in 2020.

On October 15, 2021, after two disrupted seasons due to the COVID-19 Pandemic; Nunawading City announced on their facebook page that they had parted ways with Ben Khalfallah and assistant Devon Bonne after the 2021 NPL3 Season had been cancelled. Bringing his 3 years with the club and his playing career to an end at Mahoney's Reserve.

Personal life 
Ben Khalfallah was born in Peronne, France, to Tunisian parents. His father had emigrated to France, also as a professional footballer. Although his parents were Muslim, Ben Khalfallah has described himself as an atheist.

He has often spoken very positively of the experience for himself and his family since moving to Melbourne, Australia, for Melbourne Victory, and this was a key reason for his re-signing for the club.

Ben Khalfallah currently works as a player agent.

Honours

Club 
Bordeaux
 Coupe de France: 2012–13

Melbourne Victory:
 A-League Championship: 2014–2015
 A-League Premiership: 2014–2015
 FFA Cup: 2015

Nunawading City
 Victorian State League Division 1: 2019

Individual 
 Ligue 2 UNFP Team of the Year: 2007–08
 Victory Medal: 2014–15
 A-League PFA Team of the Season: 2014–15

References

External links 
frenchleague.com

1982 births
Living people
People from Péronne, Somme
Sportspeople from Somme (department)
Footballers from Hauts-de-France
French sportspeople of Tunisian descent
Citizens of Tunisia through descent
Association football wingers
Association football forwards
Tunisian footballers
Tunisia international footballers
Amiens SC players
Stade Lavallois players
Angers SCO players
Stade Malherbe Caen players
Valenciennes FC players
FC Girondins de Bordeaux players
ES Troyes AC players
Melbourne Victory FC players
Brisbane Roar FC players
Ligue 1 players
Ligue 2 players
A-League Men players
Tunisian former Muslims
French former Muslims
Tunisian atheists
French atheists
French expatriate sportspeople in Australia
French expatriate footballers
French expatriate football managers
Tunisian expatriate football managers
Tunisian expatriate footballers
Expatriate soccer players in Australia
Expatriate soccer managers in Australia